The Mississippi State Guard (MSSG) is the state defense force of Mississippi. It operates under the authority of the Mississippi Military Department alongside the Mississippi Army National Guard (MSARNG) and the Mississippi Air National Guard (MSANG).

History
The MSSG was initially established by executive order during World War II, after Mississippi National Guard units were called to federal active duty. In 1986, the United States Army adopted the "Total Force Concept" in which the National Guard of all states are trained as, and considered an integral part of the active duty forces of the United States military, though remaining under state control unless activated to federal service. The MSSG was re-activated and reorganized as a cadre force to augment the state's National Guard forces as necessary in the event of their federal deployment.

During WWII the Mississippi State Guard was mustered into service in November 1940. The Mississippi State Guard first came into being in the early part of 1941, by Executive Order of Governor Paul B. Johnson. The initial force was an Infantry Brigade Commanded by BG Bernard E. McDearman. The force was organized from 32 municipalities and consisted of over 2,000 officers and enlisted men. The force was active through WWII until disbanded on 30 June 1947. Many members of the State Guard were incorporated into the returning National Guard on or about April 1947.

Membership
The MSSG open to citizens of Mississippi, male and female, age 17 to 62. All applicants are subject to rigid background checks. An oath of office is required, though there is no contractual obligation to members. The MSSG is an all-volunteer organization tasked with supplementing the forces of the MSARNG or MSANG when ordered by the Governor and/or Adjutant General of the State of Mississippi. While its primary mission is to assist in coping with man-made or natural disaster, the MSSG trains to be ready to meet any assignment.

Training
All new state guardsmen receive military training in the wear and appearance of their uniform, military structure and ranking system, military chain of command, rendering proper honors and respect to those appointed over them.

Guardsmen are required to train in emergency management, by taking courses provided by the Federal Emergency Management Agency (FEMA). Completion of the FEMA training is necessary to earn the Military Emergency Management Specialist Badge. Members also receive specialized training in the military police occupational specialty.

Organization
The Commanding General of the MSSG is appointed by the Adjutant General and Governor of the State of Mississippi, and reports directly to them. All commissioned officer appointments and or promotions must be approved by the Adjutant General and the Governor of Mississippi.

The Mississippi State Guard is organized into three Brigades, each with two Battalions. The units include:

1st Security Brigade
110th Battalion (Walnut Grove, MS)
2nd Security Brigade
210th Battalion (Corinth, MS)
220th Battalion (Camp McCain)
3rd Security Brigade
310th Battalion (Camp Shelby)
320th Battalion (Camp Shelby)

Ribbons and decorations
Ribbons and decorations authorized for wear on the MSSG uniforms may be those that have been officially awarded by competent authority:

 Federally authorized ribbons and decorations awarded by the branches of the U.S. Armed Forces: Army, Navy, Air Force, Marines, or Coast Guard, active or reserve components.
 State authorized ribbons and decorations awarded by the Air or Army National Guard of any state.
 Ribbons representing awards by the Mississippi State Guard.
 United States recognized foreign decorations or ribbons.
 State Guard Association of the United States (SGAUS), Military Emergency Management Academy (MEMS); MEMS Flash; MEMS Basic, Senior, or Master Qualification Badge.

Ribbons, decorations medals or badges awarded by the Civil Air Patrol, college or high school ROTC, or any other quasi-military organizations are not authorized for wear on the MSSG uniform.

Authorized state guard ribbons and awards

Individual
  MSSG Distinguished Service Ribbon
  MSSG Meritorious Service Ribbon
  MSSG Commendation Ribbon
  MSSG Achievement Ribbon
  MSSG Award of Merit
  MSSG Longevity Service Ribbon
  MSSG Operation Desert Shield/Storm Service Ribbon
  MSSG Recruitment Ribbon
  MSSG Training Ribbon
  MSSG Association Membership Ribbon

Unit
 MSSG Outstanding Unit Citation

See also

Mississippi Military Department
Mississippi Army National Guard
Mississippi Air National Guard
Mississippi Wing Civil Air Patrol

References

External links
Mississippi State Guard Official Website
History Site, State of Mississippi (Archive)

Military in Mississippi
State defense forces of the United States